An amine is an organic compound.

Amine may also refer to:

 Amine (name), alternate spelling of Amin
 Amine (singer), a French-Moroccan R&B singer
 Aminé (born 1994), American rapper

See also 

Amin (disambiguation)
Amino (disambiguation)
Anime, Japanese animation
Metal ammine complex